The Westfalenhütte is an industrial site in the northeast of Dortmund, Germany. It was established by the steel company Hoesch AG in 1871. At the peak of the so-called Wirtschaftswunder approximately 25,000 people were working there. Following changes in the steel industry and a consolidation process in the sector, activities on the Westfalenhütte were reduced to a few, economically sustainable core areas. Today more than 1,000 people are working on the site of the Westfalenhütte.

The Westfalenhütte stretches over approximately five kilometers from east to west, and nearly four kilometers from north to south. The territory is now owned by the ThyssenKrupp AG and is the largest abandoned industrial area in Europe.

Soviet leader Mikhail Gorbachev visited the Westfalenhütte in 1989 and spoke in front of 8,500 steel workers. The Westfalenhütte had its own railway station, called Dortmund-Hoesch, which was in use until 1992. A light rail station from the U44 line is still called Westfalenhütte. The Hoeschpark, a recreational area for industrial workers of the Hoesch AG, was established in 1937 on the site of the Weisse Wiese, the first home stadium of football club Borussia Dortmund.

External links

 History and pictures of the Westfalenhütte (in German) industriedenkmal.de
 map ca. 1973 
 Daniel Hinze: Westfalenhütte  (in German) dubtown.de
 Harald Finster: Phönix / Westfalenhütte / Die Westfalenhütte und das Stahlwerk 'Phönix' in Dortmund (in German)
 Ingo Bornemann: Thyssen-Krupp / Westfalenhütte Dortmund
 Hoesch-Arbeiter jubelten Gorbatschow zu  (in German) Ruhr-Nachrichten 15 June 2009

Industrial parks in Germany
Steel industry of Germany
Dortmund